Pathapatnam Assembly constituency is a constituency in Srikakulam district of Andhra Pradesh. It is one of the seven assembly segments of Srikakulam (Lok Sabha constituency), along with Ichchapuram, Palasa, Tekkali, Srikakulam, Amadalavalasa and Narasannapeta. , there are a total of 216,221 electors in the constituency. In 2019 state assembly elections, Reddy Shanthi was elected as the MLA of the constituency, representing the YSR Congress Party.

Overview

Constituency Details of Pathapatnam (Assembly constituency).
Country: India.
 State: Andhra Pradesh.
 District: Srikakulam district.
 Region: Coastal Andhra.
 Seat: Unreserved.
 Eligible Electors as per 2019 General Elections:   2,16,221 Eligible Electors. Male Electors:1,08,606 . Female Electors:1,07,598.

Mandals 

The five mandals that form the assembly constituency are:

Members of Legislative Assembly

Election results

Assembly elections 1952

Assembly Elections 1994

Assembly Elections 1999

Assembly Elections 2004

Assembly Elections 2009

Assembly elections 2014

Assembly elections 2019

See also 
 List of constituencies of the Andhra Pradesh Legislative Assembly

References 

Assembly constituencies of Andhra Pradesh